Mosko is a village in Trebinje, Bosnia and Herzegovina. It is located along the main road between the towns of Trebinje and Bileća.

History
In September 1666, Bajo Pivljanin and Mato Njegošević attacked an Ottoman caravan in Mosko and retreated to Banjani.

References

Sources

Villages in Republika Srpska
Populated places in Trebinje